The Allotments Act 1950 was an Act of Parliament passed in the United Kingdom by the Labour government of Clement Attlee. It improved provisions for compensation and tenancy rights, and abolished contract-restraints on keeping rabbits and hens on allotment gardens.

References

United Kingdom Acts of Parliament 1950